Planetary Instrument for X-Ray Lithochemistry (PIXL) is an X-ray fluorescence spectrometer to determine the fine scale elemental composition of Martian surface materials designed for the Perseverance rover as part of the Mars 2020 mission.

PIXL is manufactured and made by NASA Jet Propulsion Laboratory.

Science objectives 

The scientific objectives of the instrument are the following:
 Provide detailed geochemical assessment of past environments, habitability, and biosignature preservation potential.
 Detect any potential chemical biosignatures that are encountered and characterize the geochemistry of any other types of potential biosignatures detected.
 Provide a detailed geochemical basis for selection of a compelling set of samples for return to Earth.

Gallery

See also

 Composition of Mars
 Curiosity rover 
 Exploration of Mars
 Geology of Mars
 List of rocks on Mars
 Mars Science Laboratory
 MOXIE
 Scientific information from the Mars Exploration Rover mission
 SHERLOC
 Timeline of Mars Science Laboratory

References

External links
 Planetary Instrument for X-ray Lithochemistry - NASA Mars

Mars 2020 instruments